Bayles is both a given name and surname in the United Kingdom. The name is found in North East England, Suffolk and other areas of the United Kingdom.

The surname is also found in other countries from English/Scottish emigrants particularly the United States, Canada, Australia and New Zealand. 

Notable people with the name Bayles include:
Dan Bayles (b. 1977), American artist
Howard Bayles (1877–1940), American sport shooter
Isadore "Ike" Bayles (1876–1956), Latvian-Alaskan businessman
Lewis B. Paton (1864-1932), American biblical scholar
Lowell Bayles (1900–1931), American air racer
Martha Bayles, American writer
Matt Bayles (b. 1972), American music producer
Norman Bayles (1865–1946), Australian politician
Robert Bayles (1892–1959), Australian cricketer
Spencer Bayles, British musician
Tiga Bayles (1953–2016), Australian radio presenter
William Bayles (1820–1903), Australian politician
William Bayles (1896–1960), Tasmanian cricketer

In fiction:
China Bayles

See also
 Bailes, another surname
 Bales, another surname
 Jerry Bails (1933–2006), American popular culturist and champion of comic books

English-language surnames